is a passenger railway station located in the city of Nishiwaki, Hyōgo Prefecture, Japan, operated by West Japan Railway Company (JR West).

Lines
Hie Station is served by the Kakogawa Line and is 34.6 kilometers from the terminus of the line at

Station layout
The station consists of one ground-level side platform serving bi-directional track. The station is unattended.

History
Hie Station opened on 27 December 1924. With the privatization of the Japan National Railways (JNR) on 1 April 1987, the station came under the aegis of the West Japan Railway Company.

Passenger statistics
In fiscal 2019, the station was used by an average of 13 passengers daily

Surrounding area
 Banshu Textile Industry Cooperative 
 Shiroyama Park 
Nishiwaki Municipal Nishiwaki Higashi Junior High School 
Nishiwaki City Hiecho Elementary School

See also
List of railway stations in Japan

References

External links

  

Railway stations in Hyōgo Prefecture
Railway stations in Japan opened in 1924
Nishiwaki, Hyōgo